Suck It is a studio album by American rock and roll band Supersuckers. It was released on September 21, 2018, by Acetate Records.

Track listing
 "All of the Time"
 "The History of Rock 'n' Roll"
 "Dead Inside"
 "Breaking My Balls"
 "The Worst Thing Ever"
 "What's Up (With This Motherfucking Thing?)"
 "Cold Wet Wind"
 "(I'm Gonna Choke Myself and Masturbate) 'Til I Die"
 "Private Parking Lot"
 "Beerdrinkers and Hellraisers"

References

Supersuckers albums
2018 albums